Brendan Dunlop is a Canadian sportscaster known for his anchoring and hosting duties on The Score and Sportsnet television networks.

Dunlop was born and raised in Windsor, Ontario where he graduated from Catholic Central High School. Dunlop grew up a sports fan and had aspirations of becoming a sports journalist from watching Ray Ramano's character on Everybody Loves Raymond. Dunlop graduated from the University of Guelph-Humber. He originally wanted to be an actor.

Dunlop first gained attention cohosting The Footy Show on The Score.  He was a co-host on The Hardcore Footy Show when this show was broadcast on Hardcore Sports Radio, Sirius XM Radio channel 98, alongside English sportscasters Kristian Jack and James Sharman. He was cohost of the Fox Soccer News, on the now-defunct Canadian channel Fox Sports World Canada. Dunlop also hosted Soccer Central on Sportsnet. He co-anchored the Sportsnet Central program's weekend edition.

In 2020, Dunlop joined the OneSoccer on-air team, providing play-by-play commentary and hosted magazine shows during their coverage of the Canadian Premier League's 2020 season.

References

Canadian television sportscasters
Living people
Sportspeople from Windsor, Ontario
Year of birth missing (living people)